The 2016 Canberra Tennis International is a professional tennis tournament played on outdoor hard courts. It is the second edition of the tournament which was part of the 2016 ATP Challenger Tour and the 2016 ITF Women's Circuit. It took place in Canberra, Australia between 31 October and 6 November 2016.

This is not to be confused with 2016 Canberra Challenger.

Men's singles main draw entrants

Seeds

 1Rankings are as of 24 October 2015.

Other entrants
The following players received wildcards into the singles main draw:
  Harry Bourchier
  Thomas Fancutt
  Daniel Nolan
  Gavin van Peperzeel

The following player received entry into the singles main draw with protected ranking:
  Jarmere Jenkins

The following players received entry from the qualifying draw:
  Steven de Waard
  Greg Jones
  Daniel Masur

The following players entered as lucky losers:
  Nathan Pasha
  Darren K. Polkinghorne

Women's singles main draw entrants

Seeds

 1Rankings are as of 24 October 2016.

Other entrants
The following players received wildcards into the singles main draw:
  Seone Mendez
  Sally Peers
  Abigail Tere-Apisah
  Sara Tomic

The following players received entry from the qualifying draw:
  Georgia Brescia
  Gabriela Cé
  Abbie Myers
  Viktorija Rajicic

Champions

Men's singles

  James Duckworth def.  Marc Polmans, 7–5, 6–3

Women's singles

  Risa Ozaki def.  Georgia Brescia, 6–4, 6–4

Men's doubles

  Luke Saville /  Jordan Thompson def.  Matt Reid /  John-Patrick Smith, 6–2, 6–3

Women's doubles

  Jessica Moore /  Storm Sanders def.  Alison Bai /  Lizette Cabrera, 6–3, 6–4

External links
 Official website
 ATP Challenger Tour official site
 Canberra Tennis International at ITFtennis.com

2016 ITF Women's Circuit
2016 ATP Challenger Tour
2016
2016
2016 in Australian tennis